Na Ying (born 27 November 1967) is a Chinese singer and musical judge. She is known for her prominent roles as a judge on Chinese TV singing shows such as The Voice of China. She later transferred to the show Sing! China and remained there until 2017.

Biography

Debut
Na was born in Shenyang, Liaoning of ethnic Manchu parents. She became a member of the Liaoning Juvenile Broadcasting Chorus in 1979, and the Shenyang Singing and Dancing Troupe in 1983. In 1983, Na won the "Sunshine Ring" national singing contest and received vocal training from the famous composer Gu Jianfen.

Na began her recording career in 1988 in Taiwan and Hong Kong. In 1991 she released her first album entitled "A single woman like me", which had a very moderate reception.Two years later, in 1993, she released a new album called "I hope my dreams come true" which was not very popular either.

Success
She released her first major album Dreaming With You, in 1994. Following the release of that album, she released several additional albums, becoming one of the most popular Mandarin-language artists of Mainland China.

At the 1998 Spring Festival Gala show hosted by CCTV, Na sang a duet "Meet in '98" with Faye Wong. Wong had already achieved fame in Hong Kong and elsewhere, but the performance with Na brought her to superstar status in China itself.

Na had a relationship with Chinese footballer Gao Feng and a son by him, they separated in 2005. She married Meng Tong in 2006, and they had a daughter in 2007.

Although she devoted time to her family and children from 2002 to 2009, she never quit singing, and had a prominent role at the closing ceremony of the Beijing 2008 Summer Olympics.

At the close of 2009 she performed the concert "20 Years of Na", a retrospective of her stage career, at the Capital Gymnasium. Although her 2009 single "The Journey of Love" topped the charts wherever it was released, her early song "Follow Your Instinct" remains her favourite.

After a hiatus of nearly nine years, Na returned to the music scene in 2011, releasing a new album called So... What?. The album reached the number one position on both the mainland China and Taiwan album charts.

The Voice of China
In 2012, Na became a coach and judge on the first season of the popular television singing show The Voice of China, along with Yang Kun, Liu Huan and Yu Chengqing. She returned to the judges panel in 2013 for the second season of The Voice of China, along with Wang Feng, Zhang Hui-mei and Yu Chengqing. Na continued being a judge on the third and fourth season of that show with Wang Feng, Yang Kun, Jay Chou and Yu Chengqing.

In 2016, Na appeared on the first season of the show Sing! China, along with Wang Feng, Zhou Jielun, and Yu Chengqing. In 2017, she was also on the second season of the show along with fellow judges Zhou Jielun, Eason Chan, and Liu Huan.

On 11 October 2017, Na announced through a letter that she would be resigning as a coach from Sing! China.

Other projects
In 2017, she released NASING, an EP featuring three songs that were used in film soundtracks.

In 2018, Na Ying and Faye Wong performed together on the CCTV new year's gala singing the song "Lunar year".

In early 2021, Na participated in a popular Chinese reality TV show called Sisters Who Make Waves. After winning first place during the second season, she was invited back during the third season as one of the two group captains in Spring 2022.

Discography
The following are a selection of her albums released from 1991 to 2015.

Studio albums
 1991: 像我这样的单身女子 (A single woman like me)
 1993: 但愿好梦都成真 (I hope my dreams come true)
 1994: 為你朝思暮想 Wèi nǐ zhāo sī mù xiǎng (Dreaming with you)
 1995: 白天不懂夜的黑 Bái tiān bù dǒng yè de hēi (The day doesn't know the night)
 1998: 征服 Zhēng fú (Conquering)
 1999: 乾脆 Gān cuì (Totally)
 2000: 心酸的浪漫 Xīn suān de làng màn (Sad and romantic)
 2001: 我不是天使 Wǒ bù shì tiān shǐ (I'm not an angel)
 2002: 如今… Rújīn… (Nowadays)
 2011: 那又怎樣… Nà yòu zěn yàng… (So what?)
 2015: 默... Mò... (Sadness)
 2016: NASING (EP)

Compilationss
 2001: Na Ying selected hits

Live albums
 2001: Na Ying live in concert

References

External links
 Na Ying Official Weibo profile
 
|-
! colspan="3" style="background: #DAA520;" | Top Chinese Music Chart Awards
|-

1967 births
Living people
Chinese women singers
People's Republic of China Buddhists
Manchu singers
Manchu actresses
Musicians from Shenyang
Chinese Mandopop singers
Singers from Liaoning